Cummins-Wärtsilä Engine Co. was a 1995–2000 operated diesel engine producer, that was jointly owned by Cummins and Wärtsilä NSD.

Background 
In the 1990s, Cummins was the world's biggest high-speed diesel-engine producer in the category of 200 horsepower and over.  Meanwhile, Wärtsilä NSD, then Wärtsilä Diesel, was focussed on medium-speed engines. Cummins wanted to extend its selection in the upper range and Wärtsilä Diesel in its lower range.

Establishment 
Cummins and Wärtsilä Diesel agreed about setting up a joint venture to produce engines which would cover the gap in the engine ranges between both companies. The companies signed a letter of intent for the foundation of Cummins-Wärtsilä in December 1994. The ownership was shared 50% / 50% between Cummins and Wärtsilä Diesel. Both the Cummins President Tim Solso as well as the Wärtsilä Diesel Pentti-Juhani Hintikka had high expectations about the co-operation. In March 1995 the President of Cummins-Wärtsilä was appointed Iain M. Barrowman who had served for eight years in Cummins.

Scope 
The joint venture designed, developed and produced two product families of diesel and gas engines for power generation and marine propulsion use. Wärtsilä Diesel sold these engines with Wärtsilä brand and Cummins with its own name respectively. Initially the sales and services were carried out by both companies separately; these operations were combined in 1997.

Wärtsilä 200 family was launched shortly before the joint venture establishment. Its power range was 2 200–4 500 kW and it was produced in Wärtsilä SACM Diesel factory in Mulhouse, France. Cummins sold this engine type under name Cummins QSZ.
Cummins QSW was produced in the Cummins Daventry plant and came into market in 1997. It covered range 550–2 700 kW.

End of the joint venture 
According to analytics Cummins-Wärtsilä failed badly at introducing new engine types into market. The joint venture created significant losses.

In December 1999 Cummins reported about dissolution of the joint venture. Cummins kept the Daventry factory where it continued producing the Cummins QSW (Wärtsilä 170/180) series and the Mulhouse factory was transferred back to Wärtsilä NSD together with production of Wärtsilä 200/220 engines.

In January 2000 Ole Johansson, the President of Wärtsilä NSD said that both companies will continue the production and development of their own engine families, providing both parties better synergy benefits and improving profitability from the prevailing deficient level.

References 

Wärtsilä
Cummins
Diesel engine manufacturers
Marine engine manufacturers
1995 establishments in Europe
2000 disestablishments in Europe